Jens van 't Wout (born 6 October 2001) is a Dutch short track speed skater He set an Olympic Record with the Dutch team in the Mixed 2000 metre relay at the 2022 Winter Olympics.

References

External links

2001 births
Living people
Dutch male short track speed skaters
World Short Track Speed Skating Championships medalists
Olympic short track speed skaters of the Netherlands
People from Laren, North Holland
Short track speed skaters at the 2022 Winter Olympics
21st-century Dutch people